The Day After Valentine's is a 2018 Philippine romantic film written and directed by Jason Paul Laxamana starring Bela Padilla and JC Santos. The film was released by Viva Films on 15 August 2018 as one of the official entries of the Pista ng Pelikulang Pilipino.

Cast

Main cast

Summaries
Lani and Kai meet and become friends. Bela Padilla as Lani, is a store assistant while JC Santos as Kai, is a young man who is having a hard time moving and fixing his life after a breakup. They spend Valentine's Day. His mother lives in Lanai. When Kai needs to go home to Hawaii, he invites Lani to come with him with his family.

References

External links

2018 films
Philippine romantic drama films
Viva Films films